A diesel multiple unit or DMU is a multiple-unit train powered by on-board diesel engines. A DMU requires no separate locomotive, as the engines are incorporated into one or more of the carriages. Diesel-powered single-unit railcars are also generally classed as DMUs. Diesel-powered units may be further classified by their transmission type:  diesel–mechanical DMMU, diesel–hydraulic DHMU, or diesel–electric DEMU.

Design
The diesel engine may be located above the frame in an engine bay or under the floor. Driving controls can be at both ends, on one end, or in a separate car.

Types by transmission
DMUs are usually classified by the method of transmitting motive power to their wheels.

Diesel–mechanical 
In a diesel–mechanical multiple unit (DMMU), the rotating energy of the engine is transmitted via a gearbox and driveshaft directly to the wheels of the train, like a car. The transmissions can be shifted manually by the driver, as in the great majority of first-generation British Rail DMUs, but in most applications, gears are changed automatically.

Diesel–hydraulic

In a diesel–hydraulic multiple unit (DHMU), a hydraulic torque converter, a type of fluid coupling, acts as the transmission medium for the motive power of the diesel engine to turn the wheels. Some units feature a hybrid mix of hydraulic and mechanical transmissions, usually reverting to the latter at higher operating speeds as this decreases engine RPM and noise.

Diesel–electric 

In a diesel–electric multiple unit (DEMU), a diesel engine drives an electrical generator or an alternator which produces electrical energy. The generated current is then fed to electric traction motors on the wheels or bogies in the same way as a conventional diesel–electric locomotive.

On some DEMUs, such as the Bombardier Voyager, each car is entirely self-contained and has its own engine, generator and electric motors. In other designs, such as the British Rail Class 207 or the Stadler GTW and Stadler FLIRT DMU, some cars within the consist may be entirely unpowered or only feature electric motors, obtaining electric current from other cars in the consist which have a generator and engine.

With diesel–electric transmission, some DMU can be no other than an EMU without pantograph or contact shoes (for use on the former British Rail Southern Region), which "is substituted" by one or more on-board diesel generators; this kind of DEMU can be potentially upgraded to electro-diesel multiple unit EDMU, becoming a bi-mode multiple units train (BMU), just adding one or two pantographs or contact shoes (with opportune converters, if necessary) and related modifications on the electric system.

Around the world

Europe

Belgium 
NMBS/SNCB uses its NMBS/SNCB Class 41 DMUs on the few remaining unelectrified lines. As electrification progresses, the DMUs become less and less important.

Croatia 

Diesel multiple units cover large number of passenger lines in Croatia which are operated by the national passenger service operator HŽ Putnički Prijevoz. On Croatian Railways, DMUs have important role since they cover local, regional and distant lines all across the country. The country's two largest towns, Zagreb and Split, are connected with an inter-city service that is provided by DMU tilting trains "RegioSwinger" (Croatian series 7123) since 2004. Those trains may also cover other lines in the country depending on need and availability.

Luxury DMU series 7021, built in France, started to operate for Yugoslav Railways in 1972 and after 1991 stil remained in service of Croatian Railways until 2005. Units 7121 and 7122 (which came as a replacement for 7221 units), together with the newest series 7022 and 7023 built in 2010s Croatia, cover many of the country's local and regional services on unelectrified or partly electrified lines.

Czech Republic 

Diesel multiple units also cover large number of passenger lines in the Czech Republic which are operated by the national operator České dráhy. They have important role since they cover local, regional and distant lines all across the country. Those trains may also cover other lines in the country depending on need and availability too.

Also, the DMUs were manufactured for foreign carriers. The tables of cars and units are divided into vehicles operated until 1987, when the ČSD used the series designations proposed by Vojtěch Kryšpín, and vehicles created after this date, which no longer have Kryšpín's designations (with some exceptions). In addition, these new cars are the new vehicles are already different in both countries.

Estonia
Elron has since 2015 a Stadler FLIRT fleet, with 20 trains DEMU version.

Germany

Germany has employed DMUs for both commuter and express services for many decades.  The SVT 877 Fliegender Hamburger DMU, introduced in 1933, made the run from Berlin to Hamburg in an astonishing 138 minutes, and its derivative SVT 137 broke the land speed record in 1936. After World War 2, the VT 11.5 DMU was the flagship of the glamorous Trans Europ Express.

Since 1968, DB has designated DMUs with class numbers beginning in 6.  While DB and regional transport authorities generally prefer electric power for commuter rail, many local and rural lines remain un-electrified, and DMUs are invaluable in providing services to those areas. DMUs in service as of 2021 include the Adtranz Class 612 tilting train ("Regio Swinger"), the Alstom Coradia LINT (Classes 620–623, 640 and 648), the Siemens Desiro (Class 642) and the Bombardier Talent (Class 643/644). From 2001 to 2016 there was even a DMU version of DB's high-speed Intercity Express, the Class 605 ICE TD.

Greece

Diakopto–Kalavryta railway

Ireland

In the Republic of Ireland the Córas Iompair Éireann (CIÉ), which controlled the republic's railways between 1945 and 1986, introduced DMUs in the mid-1950s and they were the first diesel trains on many main lines.

Romania

DMUs are used mostly on shorter or less frequently travelled routes in remote areas. The national railway company CFR still uses, along with other DMU models, Class 77 and 78 DMUs, locally built by Malaxa between the 1930s and 50s and refurbished in the 70s. The main DMU in use is the Class 96 Siemens Desiro aka Săgeata Albastră (The Blue Arrow). Private operators also largely use DMU units, mainly purchased from various French and German operators.

Slovakia

In the present, several types of DMUs operate in Slovakia. Was the most common type in Slovakia is a Class 812 ZSSK based on the ČD Class 810. These are used almost exclusively for hauling passenger trains on non-electrified regional lines and these trains often excel in low travel speeds. In the past, however, in Slovakia there were a number of express trains driven by motor coaches, which often overcame heavier trains driven by steam locomotives at cruising speed, and classic sets. A typical example can be, for example, the Slovenská strela motor express train led on the Bratislava-Prague route by a motor car of the same name, or the Tatran express from Bratislava to Košice. Representatives of high-speed motor wagons were, for example, motor wagons of the M262 or M286 series, which, however, lost their application in high-speed wagons due to the gradual electrification of main lines and were, like the current wagons currently used for passenger trains.

United Kingdom

The first significant use of DMUs in the United Kingdom was by the Great Western Railway, which introduced its small but successful series of diesel–mechanical GWR railcars in 1934. The London & North Eastern Railway and London, Midland & Scottish Railway also experimented with DMUs in the 1930s, the LMS both on its own system, and on that of its Northern Irish subsidiary, but development was curtailed by World War II.

After nationalisation, British Railways (BR) revived the concept in the early 1950s. At that time there was an urgent need to move away from expensive steam traction which led to many experimental designs using diesel propulsion and multiple units. The early DMUs proved successful, and under BR's 1955 Modernisation Plan the building of a large fleet was authorised. These BR "First Generation" DMUs were built between 1956 and 1963.

BR required that contracts for the design and manufacture of new locomotives and rolling stock be split between numerous private firms as well as BR's own workshops, while different BR Regions laid down different specifications. The result was a multitude of different types, one of which was:
 'Intercity' units, which were more substantially constructed, and shared many features with contemporary hauled coaching stock. They were built for express services on important secondary routes on the Scottish, North Eastern and Western regions.

In 1960, British Railways introduced its Blue Pullman high-speed DEMUs.
These were few in number and relatively short-lived, but they paved the way for the very successful InterCity 125 or High Speed Train (HST) units, which were built between 1975 and 1982 to take over most principal express services on non-electrified routes.
These  trains run with a streamlined power car at each end and (typically) seven to nine intermediate trailer cars. Although originally classified as DEMUs, the trailer cars are very similar to loco-hauled stock, and the power cars were later reclassified as locomotives under Class 43. HSTs started being replaced in 2017, but as of October 2022 some are still in use.

By the early 1980s, many of the surviving First Generation units were reaching the end of their design life, leading to spiralling maintenance costs, poor reliability and a poor public image for the railway. A stopgap solution was to convert some services back to locomotive haulage, as spare locomotives and hauled coaching stock were available, but this also increased operating costs. Commencing in the mid '80s, British Rail embarked upon its so called "Sprinterisation" programme, to replace most of the first generation DMUs and many locomotive-hauled trains with three new families of DMU:
Class 140–144 Pacer railbuses, ultra-low-cost diesel–mechanical units utilising four-wheeled chassis and lightweight bus bodywork, designed for provincial branch line and stopping services.
Sprinter a family of diesel–hydraulic DMUs. These fall into three sub-groups; Class 150 Sprinters (for branch line/commuter service), Class 153 / 155 / 156 Super Sprinters (for longer cross country services), and Class 158 / 159 Express units (for secondary express services);
Networker diesel–hydraulic units, of Class 165 Network Turbo (standard commuter version) and Class 166 Network Express (for longer distance commuter services). These took over the remaining non-electric commuter services into London.

Following the impact of the privatisation of British Rail in the late 1990s, several other diesel–hydraulic DMU families have been introduced:
 Class 168 Clubman and Class 170/171/172 Bombardier Turbostar, a development of the earlier Networkers. These are built by Adtranz and later Bombardier at Derby Litchurch Lane Works and are the most numerous and widespread of the post-privatisation designs. Purchased by Anglia Railways, Central Trains, Chiltern Railways, London Midland, London Overground Rail Operations, Midland Mainline and ScotRail.
Class 175 Alstom Coradia were designed by Alstom as a rival to the 170 Turbostar, but bought only by First North Western
Class 180 Adelante were an Alstom design for express services built only for First Great Western
Class 185 Siemens Desiro, built by Siemens introduced in 2006 by First TransPennine Express
Class 195/196 CAF Civity, being built by CAF for Arriva Rail North and West Midlands Trains
Class 220/221/222 Voyagers/Meridian built by Bombardier in Bruges for Hull Trains, Midland Mainline and Virgin CrossCountry

In 2018, the first bi and tri-mode electro-diesel multiple units were introduced:
Class 800/802s are being built by Hitachi for Great Western Railway, Hull Trains, London North Eastern Railway and TransPennine Express
Class 755 Stadler FLIRT are to be operated by Abellio Greater Anglia
Class 769s are being converted by Brush Traction from Class 319s for Arriva Rail North, Great Western Railway and KeolisAmey Wales
Class 230s are being converted by Vivarail from London Underground D78 Stock for West Midland Trains and Transport for WalesTransport for Wales Rail

North America

Canada

Canada generally follows similar buffer strength requirements to the US, but new services are evaluated on a case-by-case basis. As a result, several types of lightweight DMUs have been used:

 The O-Train Trillium Line in Ottawa, Ontario uses European-standard Alstom Coradia LINT (previously Bombardier Talent) DMUs on conventional railway tracks under a specific safety agreement with Transport Canada.
 Via Rail operates Budd Rail Diesel Cars on its Sudbury – White River train.
 Réseau Charlevoix (Le Massif) operates a shuttle in the Charlevoix region, Québec.
 Union Pearson Express uses Nippon Sharyo DMU trains for express service between Union Station and Pearson Airport.

Costa Rica

Costa Rica has purchased several Apolo 2400 series DMU railcars from the former narrow gauge operator in Spain, which are run in commuter service.

United States

A type of diesel multiple units in the U.S. was the Budd Rail Diesel Car (RDC). The RDC was a single passenger car with two diesel engines and two sets of controls.

In the United States, DMU systems must be FRA-compliant to be permitted on freight rail corridors. The Federal Railway Administration has mandated higher coupling strength requirements than European regulators, effectively prohibiting the use of lighter weight European-style inter-city rail DMUs on U.S. main line railways without timesharing with freight operations or special waivers from the FRA. This has greatly restricted the development of DMUs within the U.S. as no other country requires the much heavier FRA compliant vehicles, and no export market for them exists.

Operations using FRA-compliant vehicles:
In early 2007, three more bi-level DMUs and an additional bi-level non-powered coach were acquired.
 Since February 2009, TriMet is using FRA-compliant Colorado Railcar DMUs for its rush-hour WES Commuter Rail service, a suburb-to-suburb line between Beaverton and Wilsonville, Oregon. The opening of the line was delayed from fall 2008 to early 2009 due to delays in getting the vehicles. TriMet also has four refurbished former Alaska RR and Trinity Railway Express RDCs as backup trainsets for when one or more Colorado Railcar DMUs is out of service.
 Also in Oregon, former BC Rail RDCs were used on the Lewis and Clark Explorer excursion train from Portland to Astoria.
 Sonoma–Marin Area Rail Transit, also referred to as SMART, operates Nippon Sharyo DMUs (the same as those in Toronto) on its route between Larkspur and Santa Rosa, California. Service commenced in 2017.

Operations using non FRA-compliant vehicles:
 Capital Metro uses Stadler GTW cars to operate Capital MetroRail, a commuter rail line serving the Greater Austin, Texas area.
 In Denton County, Texas, DCTA also uses Stadler GTW cars to operate its A-train service. DCTA has secured from the FRA the first-ever alternative vehicle technology waiver to use these cars on active freight corridors.

 TEXRail in Tarrant County, Texas is a commuter rail line operated by Trinity Metro which uses Stadler FLIRT DMUs. The vehicles are FRA Alternate Compliant. The line has 9 stops with termini at DFW Airport and T&P Station.
 NJ Transit operates the River Line from Camden, NJ to Trenton, NJ, every 15 minutes during peak hours and every 30 minutes at other times. It uses modified Stadler GTW trains of one or two cars. The line is classified as light rail because it utilizes imported European made DMUs that do not meet FRA crash guidelines. The cars may not operate with the freight rail service that shares the line, so evening operating hours are restricted to Saturday nights. This line currently carries over 7,500 passengers on a typical weekday, exceeding expectations.

 NCTD operates the Sprinter line using Desiro Classic DMUs built by Siemens. Opened March, 2008, The line operates every half-hour daily, except limitations in the morning and at night on Saturday, Sunday and on holidays. The line runs from Oceanside, CA, where transfer is possible with Coaster commuter rail service to San Diego, to Escondido, CA. Like the NJT River Line, it is classified as light rail due to the use of European made DMUs, but does not run at a more typical light rail frequency.
 The eBART expansion of the Bay Area Rapid Transit System implements Stadler GTW diesel multiple unit train service from Pittsburg/Bay Point station east along the Highway 4 corridor to the town of Antioch. Future expansions in this direction could also connect the eBART service to Oakley, Brentwood, Byron, and beyond to Tracy and Stockton. The DMU system was chosen as a less-expensive alternative to the existing third-rail BART design. Service began on 25 May 2018.

Proposed operations:
 The Los Angeles County Metropolitan Transportation Authority approved an allocation of $250,000 for a feasibility study of DMUs for "future transportation options for the region" on 5 July 2006 (Ara Najarian, Metro Board Member).
 Chicago's commuter rail line, Metra, is studying the use of DMUs on its newly proposed lines (STAR line, SES). They claim these DMUs will have better acceleration, be more fuel efficient, and seat more customers than the current diesel locomotive and double decker rail cars that are currently in use.
 Seattle area – The Central Puget Sound's regional transit agency Sound Transit, along with the Puget Sound Regional Council evaluated the feasibility of both DMU and diesel locomotive technology for operation in the Eastside BNSF Corridor in response to a state legislative request. The Eastside BNSF corridor runs from the City of Snohomish in the north to Renton in the south of the metro area. Sound Transit has no plans to operate passenger rail service in the eastside BNSF corridor, but has committed limited funds to provide capital improvements in the event another public or private operator proposes to operate the service.
 Anchorage Mat-Su area – As part of a joint U.S. Forest Service (USFS) and ARRC Chugach Forest Whistle Stop project, a self-propelled rail car was purchased and delivered spring 2009. The diesel multiple unit (DMU) may be available for flexible demonstration service during winter months.
 The Long Island Rail Road, the busiest commuter railroad in the United States, is exploring the possibility of operating DMUs on some of its lesser traveled routes in non-electrified territory (on the Montauk, Greenport, Port Jefferson, and Oyster Bay branches), where operation of its current fleet of C3 bilevel railcars pulled by DE30AC/DM30AC locomotives is uneconomical and inefficient.
 Arrow will utilize Stadler FLIRT trainsets along its service route in Redlands, California.
 A proposal to use DMUs on Boston's Fairmount Line was initially approved, but was canceled in 2016.
 New Jersey Transit's Passaic–Bergen–Hudson Transit Project is studying the re-introduction passenger service on a portion of the New York, Susquehanna and Western Railway (NYSW) right-of-way in Passiac, Bergen and Hudson counties using newly built, FRA-compliant diesel multiple units.
 Dallas Area Rapid Transit is rebuilding the Cotton Belt Rail Line as the Silver Line, which will utilize Stadler FLIRT units.

Asia/Australasia

Australia

DMUs were first introduced to Australia in the late mid-20th century for use on quiet branch lines that could not justify a locomotive hauled service. Today, DMUs are widely used throughout Australia's southern states:

 Adelaide Metro use 3000 class DMUs on their suburban network.
 NSW TrainLink use Xplorer DMUs on services from Sydney to Canberra (ACT), Griffith, Broken Hill, Armidale and Moree. Endeavour DMUs are used on services to Bathurst, Moss Vale and Goulburn on the Southern Highlands line, Kiama to Bomaderry and on the Hunter line. Hunter DMUs are also used on the Hunter line.
 Victoria's V/Line uses Sprinter and V/Locity DMUs on all medium distance services.
 Western Australia's Transwa operates the Prospector, AvonLink and Australind on medium and long distance country services.

In Queensland, heritage DMUs are used on the Savannahlander and Gulflander tourist trains.

Bangladesh
Chinese manufactured (CNR Tangshan) DEMU was introduced in Bangladesh from 25 May 2013. DEMU is the country's first-ever commuter train service starting its journey on the Chittagong–Fouzdarhat line. These DEMUs also operate on the Chittagong Circular Railway and on the Bangladesh Railway's service between Dhaka and Narayanganj.

Cambodia

Mexican manufacturer Ferrovias Del Bajio supplied in 2019, three DSUs (Diesel Single Unit) to Royal Railway in Cambodia for their airport shuttle service from Phnom Penh international airport to the city central station. The other two units were assigned to long-distance services from the central station to Sihanoukville and to Poipet.

India

DMUs (DEMUs) are widely used in India. DEMUs in India are used in both the eight-coach format and the four-coach format. These trains replaced many (up to 10 car) trains with a WDM-2 or WDM-3A locomotive in the middle. These old trains had the loco controls duplicated in the Driving Trailer coach and all the actuation information reaching the locomotive through thin communication lines. This was called 'push-pull train'. The longest running such push-pull service operated between Diva - Bhiwandi Road and Vasai Road and was recently converted into an MEMU train service in 2018.

India's first and largest DMU shed at Jalandhar, Punjab, holds more than 90 units placed in service all over Punjab.
First generation DMU:
Rated power was 700 HP and had three or six coaches, made first by ICF. 
Transmission was Voith-hydraulic. 
Max speed 100 km/h.

Second generation DMU:
Rated power is ,1400 HP and have eight coaches. 
Max speed is 105 km/h. 
Transmission is DC electric. 
Made at ICF and RCF.

Third generation DMU:
Rated power is 1,600 HP and have ten coaches. 
Max speed is 110 km/h. 
Transmission is AC electric. 
Made at ICF.

Indonesia

State-owned company PT.INKA builds several type of DMU, some of which operate in urban and suburban areas:
 Kualanamu Airport Rail Link 
 Minangkabau Airport Rail Link
 Adisumarmo Airport Rail Link
 Kedungsepur
 Sri Lelawangsa
 Prambanan Express
 Kertalaya Railbus
 Bathara Kresna Railbus

Japan

In Japan, where gasoline-driven railbuses (on small private lines) and railmotors (Kihani 5000 of the national railways) had been built since the 1920s, the first two streamlined DMUs came in service in 1937, class Kiha 43000 (キハ43000系).

The service of several hundreds (in sum even thousands) of diesel railcars and DMUs started in 1950s following the improvement of fuel supply that was critical during World War II.

Kenya

In 2021, Kenya acquired DMUs from France to operate in the Nairobi Metropolitan Area. These trains connect the city with settlements outside Nairobi, Jomo Kenyatta International Airport and the Nairobi Terminus.

Malaysia
The Keretapi Tanah Melayu (KTM) has a total of 13 DMU KTM Class 61 ordered from CRRC for the West Coast Line and are assembled locally at CRRCs Batu Gajah factory from 2016 to 2020. The first scheduled service is expected from 1 September along the Gemas-Johor Bahru route, replacing old non-automotive stock.

Philippines

The Philippine National Railways (PNR) was one of the first adopters of diesel multiple unit trains in Asia. Initially built as gasoline-powered railmotors, the locally assembled Manila Railroad RMC class of 1929 was the first to be powered by diesel traction. Some units were also converted to streamliner units by 1932 for first-class services on the South Main Line between Manila and Legazpi, Albay. Since then, generations of DMUs were used chiefly for short-distance commuter services by the PNR in the island of Luzon.

Even without active inter-city rail services in the present-day, DMUs are still used on the PNR Metro Commuter Line in Metro Manila and the Bicol Commuter service in the Bicol Region. Three generations of DMUs are in use: second-hand DMUs handed over by JR East such as the KiHa 35, 52 and 59 series originally built in the 1960s and acquired in the early 2010s, the Rotem DMUs of 2009 built by Korean manufacturer Hyundai Rotem, and the 8000 and 8100 classes built by Indonesian firm PT INKA.

From 2022 onwards, the PNR will purchase standard gauge DMUs for its upcoming inter-city rail network in Luzon and Mindanao. This is compared to the 3 ft 6 in gauge of the rolling stock that is currently in active service. This move should allow access to better technology and increase line speeds.

South Korea

Korail operates many DMUs.

Sri Lanka
DMUs were first introduced to Sri Lanka in 1940. The aim of this was connecting minor railway stations and stops on the main line where most express trains don't have a halt.

Taiwan
The DMUs are now usually used on the Taiwan Railway Administration Hualien–Taitung Line, North-Link Line, South-Link Line. DMUs in Taiwan are classified as Class DR.
Class DR2700 – built by Tokyu Car Corporation in 1966; was the fastest train on the West Coast line
Class DR2800 – built by Tokyu Car Corporation in 1982 and 1984
Class DR2900
Class DR3000
Class DR3100

Manufacturers
DMU manufacturers include:

 Alstom
 AnsaldoBreda, Italy
 BEML, India
 BHEL, India
 Bombardier Transportation of Montreal, Canada
 British Rail Engineering Limited, United Kingdom (1962-1980s)
 British Railways, United Kingdom (1950s–1962)
 Budd Company of United States
 CAF
 Colorado Railcar, US (Rader Railcar 1988–1997, Colorado Railcar 1997–2008, US Railcar 2009– )
 DMZ, Russia
 EIKON International
 Ferrovias Del Bajio S.A. de C.V., Mexico
 Ganz-MÁVAG, Hungary
 Hyundai Rotem of Seoul, South Korea
 INKA, Indonesia
 Integral Coach Factory, Chennai, India
 Luganskteplovoz, Ukraine
 Materfer, Argentina
 Metrovagonmash, Russia
 Niigata Transys of Tokyo, Japan
 Nippon Sharyo/Sumitomo, Japan
 Pojazdy Szynowe Pesa Bydgoszcz
 RVR, Latvia
 Siemens Mobility DMU
 Srida, China
 Stadler Rail of Bussnang, Switzerland
 Torzhoksky car-building factory, Russia
 TÜVASAŞ of Adapazarı, Turkey

See also

 Electric multiple unit
 Battery electric multiple unit
 Diesel locomotive

References

Multiple units
 

fr:Rame automotrice#Élément automoteur diesel